Marco Antonio Marescotti (29 April – 8 December 1681) was a Roman Catholic prelate who served as Bishop of Chiusi (1664–1681).

Biography
Marco Antonio Marescotti was born in Siena, Italy and ordained a priest on 2 February 1664.
On 11 February 1664, Alessandro Piccolomini was appointed during the papacy of Pope Alexander VII as Bishop of Chiusi. 
He served as Bishop of Chiusi until his death on 8 December 1681.

References

External links and additional sources
 (for Chronology of Bishops) 
 (for Chronology of Bishops) 

17th-century Italian Roman Catholic bishops
Bishops appointed by Pope Alexander VII
1681 deaths
1625 births
Bishops of Chiusi